Karl Wilhelm Friedrich (after 1814: von) Schlegel (10 March 1772 – 12 January 1829) was a German poet, literary critic, philosopher, philologist, and Indologist. With his older brother, August Wilhelm Schlegel, he was one of the main figures of Jena Romanticism.

Born into a fervently Protestant family, Schlegel rejected religion as a young man in favor of atheism and individualism. He entered university to study law but instead focused on classical literature. He began a career as a writer and lecturer, and founded journals such as Athenaeum. In 1808, Schlegel returned to Christianity as a married man with both him and his wife being baptized into the Catholic Church. This conversion ultimately led to his estrangement from family and old friends. He moved to Austria in 1809, where he became a diplomat and journalist in service of Klemens von Metternich, the Foreign Minister of the Austrian Empire. Schlegel died in 1829, at the age of 56.

Schlegel was a promoter of the Romantic movement and inspired Samuel Taylor Coleridge, Adam Mickiewicz and Kazimierz Brodziński. The first to notice what became known as Grimm's law, Schlegel was a pioneer in Indo-European studies, comparative linguistics, and morphological typology, publishing in 1819 the first theory linking the Indo-Iranian and German languages under the Aryan group.

Life and work

Karl Friedrich von Schlegel was born on 10 March 1772 at Hanover, where his father, Johann Adolf Schlegel, was the pastor at the Lutheran Market Church. For two years he studied law at Göttingen and Leipzig, and he met with Friedrich Schiller. In 1793 he devoted himself entirely to literary work. In 1796 he moved to Jena, where his brother August Wilhelm lived, and here he collaborated with Novalis, Ludwig Tieck, Fichte, and Caroline Schelling, who married August Wilhelm. Novalis and Schlegel had a famous conversation about German idealism. In 1797 he quarreled with Schiller, who did not like his polemic work. 

Schlegel published Die Griechen und Römer (The Greeks and Romans), which was followed by Geschichte der Poesie der Griechen und Römer (History of the Poesy of the Greeks and Romans) (1798). Then he turned to Dante, Goethe, and Shakespeare. In Jena he and his brother founded the journal Athenaeum, contributing fragments, aphorisms, and essays in which the principles of the Romantic school are most definitely stated. They are now generally recognized as the deepest and most significant expressions of the subjective idealism of the early Romanticists. After a controversy, Friedrich decided to move to Berlin. There he lived with Friedrich Schleiermacher and met Henriette Herz, Rahel Varnhagen, and his future wife, Dorothea Veit, a daughter of Moses Mendelssohn. In 1799 he published Lucinde, which was seen as an account of his affair with Dorothea, causing a scandal in German literary circles. The unfinished novel attempted to apply the Romantic demand for complete individual freedom to practical ethics. Lucinde, which extolled the union of sensual and spiritual love as an allegory of the divine cosmic Eros, contributed to the failure of his academic career in Jena  where he completed his studies in 1801 and lectured as a Privatdozent on transcendental philosophy. In September 1800, he met four times with Goethe, who would later stage his tragedy Alarcos (1802) in Weimar, albeit with a notable lack of success.

In June 1802 he arrived in Paris, where he lived in the house formerly owned by Baron d'Holbach and joined a circle including Heinrich Christoph Kolbe. He lectured on philosophy in private courses for Sulpiz Boisserée, and under the tutelage of Antoine-Léonard de Chézy and linguist Alexander Hamilton he continued to study Sanskrit and the Persian language. He edited the journal Europa (1803), where he published essays about Gothic architecture and the Old Masters. In April 1804 he married Dorothea Veit in the Swedish embassy in Paris, after she had undergone the requisite conversion from Judaism to Protestantism. In 1806 he and his wife went to visit Aubergenville, where his brother lived with Madame de Staël.

In 1808, he published an epoch-making book, Über die Sprache und Weisheit der Indier (On the Language and Wisdom of India). Here he advanced his ideas about religion and importantly argued that a people originating from India were the founders of the first European civilizations. Schlegel compared Sanskrit with Latin, Greek, Persian and German, noting many similarities in vocabulary and grammar. The assertion of the common features of these languages is now generally accepted, albeit with significant revisions. There is less agreement about the geographic region where these precursors settled, although the Out-of-India model has generally become discredited.

In 1808, he and his wife joined the Catholic Church in the Cologne Cathedral. From this time on, he became more and more opposed to the principles of political and religious liberalism. He went to Vienna and in 1809 was appointed imperial court secretary at the military headquarters, editing the army newspaper and issuing fiery proclamations against Napoleon. He accompanied archduke Charles, Duke of Teschen to war and was stationed in Pest during the War of the Fifth Coalition. Here he studied the Hungarian language. Meanwhile, he had published his collected Geschichte (Histories) (1809) and two series of lectures, Über die neuere Geschichte (On Recent History) (1811) and Geschichte der alten und neuen Literatur (On Old and New Literature) (1815). In 1814 he was knighted in the Supreme Order of Christ.

Following the Congress of Vienna (1815), he was councilor of legation in the Austrian embassy at the Frankfurt Diet, but in 1818 he returned to Vienna. In 1819 he and Clemens Brentano made a trip to Rome, in the company of Metternich and Gentz. There he met with his wife and her sons. In 1820 he started a conservative Catholic magazine, Concordia (1820–1823), but was criticized by Metternich and by his brother August Wilhelm, then professor of Indology in Bonn and busy publishing the Bhagavad Gita. Schlegel began the issue of his Sämtliche Werke (Collected Works). He also delivered lectures, which were republished in his Philosophie des Lebens (Philosophy of Life) (1828) and in his Philosophie der Geschichte (Philosophy of History) (1829). He died on 12 January 1829 at Dresden, while preparing a series of lectures.

Dorothea Schlegel
Friedrich Schlegel's wife, Dorothea von Schlegel, authored an unfinished romance, Florentin (1802), a Sammlung romantischer Dichtungen des Mittelalters (Collection of Romantic Poems of the Middle Ages) (2 vols., 1804), a version of Lother und Maller (1805), and a translation of Madame de Staël's Corinne (1807–1808) — all of which were issued under her husband's name. By her first marriage she had two sons, Johannes and Philipp Veit, who became eminent Catholic painters.

Selected works

 Vom ästhetischen Werte der griechischen Komödie (1794)
 Über die Diotima (1795)
 Versuch über den Begriff des Republikanismus (1796)
 Georg Forster (1797)
 Über das Studium der griechischen Poesie (1797)
 Über Lessing (1797)
 Kritische Fragmente („Lyceums“-Fragmente) (1797)
 Fragmente („Athenaeums“-Fragmente) (1797–1798)
 Lucinde (1799)
 Über die Philosophie. An Dorothea (1799)
 Gespräch über die Poesie (1800)
 Über die Unverständlichkeit (1800)
 Ideen (1800)
 Charakteristiken und Kritiken (1801)
 Transcendentalphilosophie (1801)
 Alarkos (1802)
 Reise nach Frankreich (1803
 Geschichte der europäischen Literatur (1803/1804
 Grundzüge der gotischen Baukunst (1804/1805)
 Über die Sprache und Weisheit der Indier (1808)
 Deutsches Museum (as ed.), 4 Vols. Vienna (1812–1813)
 Geschichte der alten und neueren Literatur (lectures) (1815)

Letters
 Ludwig Tieck und die Brüder Schlegel. Briefe ed. by Edgar Lohner (München 1972)

Friedrich Schlegel's Sämtliche Werke appeared in 10 vols. (1822–1825); a second edition (1846) in 55 vols. His Prosaische Jugendschriften (1794–1802) have been edited by J. Minor (1882, 2nd ed. 1906); there are also reprints of Lucinde, and F. Schleiermacher's Vertraute Briefe über Lucinde, 1800 (1907). See R. Haym, Die romantische Schule (1870); I. Rouge, F. Schlegel et la genie du romantisme allemand (1904); by the same, Erläuterungen zu F. Schlegels „Lucinde“ (1905); M. Joachimi, Die Weltanschauung der Romantik (1905); W. Glawe, Die Religion F. Schlegels (1906); E. Kircher, Philosophie der Romantik (1906); M. Frank "Unendliche Annäherung". Die Anfänge der philosophischen Frühromantik (1997); Andrew Bowie, From Romanticism to Critical Theory: The Philosophy of German Literary Theory (1997).

Notes

Further reading
 Crowe, Benjamin D. "Friedrich Schlegel and the character of romantic ethics." Journal of ethics 14.1 (2010): 53-79. online 
 Forster, Michael N. and Kristin Gjesdal (eds.) The Oxford Handbook of German Philosophy in the Nineteenth Century (Oxford UP, 2015)
 Forster, Michael N. After Herder: Philosophy of Language in the German Tradition(Oxford UP, 2010).
 Germana, Nicholas A. "Self-othering in German orientalism: The case of Friedrich Schlegel." Comparatist 34 (2010): 80-94. online
Philippe Lacoue-Labarthe and Jean-Luc Nancy, The Literary Absolute: The Theory of Literature in German Romanticism, Albany: State University Press of New York, 1988. [A philosophical exegesis of early romantic theory focused on F. Schlegel, Novalis, and the Athenaeum.]
 Lejeune, Guillaume. "Towards a pragmatic semantics: Dialogue and representation in Friedrich Schlegel and Schleiermacher." Language and dialogue 2.1 (2012): 156-173. online
 Millán, Elizabeth. Friedrich Schlegel and the emergence of romantic philosophy (SUNY Press, 2012). link
 Newmark, Kevin. Irony on Occasion: From Schlegel and Kierkegaard to Derrida and de Man (Fordham UP, 2012).
 Paulin, Roger. The Life of August Wilhelm Schlegel, Cosmopolitan of Art and Poetry (Open Book Publishers, 2016). online
Berman, Antoine. L'épreuve de l'étranger. Culture et traduction dans l'Allemagne romantique: Herder, Goethe, Schlegel, Novalis, Humboldt, Schleiermacher, Hölderlin., Paris, Gallimard, Essais, 1984.

External links

Dictionary of Art 

Schlegel, Friedrich von, 1841 
Schlegel, Friedrich von, 1772–1829; Robertson, James Burton, 1800–1877, 1846 
Schiller, Friedrich, 1759–1805; Körner, Christian Gottfried, 1756–1831; Simpson, Leonard Francis, translated 1849 
Schlegel, Friedrich von, 1855 
Friedrich von Schlegel, Ellen J . Millington, 1860 
Samuel Paul Capen, 1903 
Wilson, Augusta Manie, 1908 
Calvin, Thomas, 1913 

1772 births
1829 deaths
18th-century German dramatists and playwrights
18th-century German novelists
18th-century German philosophers
18th-century non-fiction writers
19th-century German dramatists and playwrights
19th-century German non-fiction writers
19th-century German male writers
19th-century German novelists
19th-century German philosophers
Continental philosophers
Converts to Roman Catholicism from Lutheranism
Epistemologists
German Hispanists
German Indologists
German literary critics
German male novelists
German male dramatists and playwrights
German male non-fiction writers
German monarchists
German philologists
German Roman Catholics
German untitled nobility
Indigenous Aryanists
Indo-Europeanists
Mendelssohn family
Writers from Hanover
People from the Electorate of Hanover
Philosophers of culture
Philosophers of education
Philosophers of history
Philosophers of language
Philosophers of literature
Political philosophers
Catholic philosophers
Roman Catholic writers
Romanticism
Social philosophers
University of Göttingen alumni
S